St. Oliver Plunkett's Primary School may refer to:

 St. Oliver Plunkett's Primary School, Forkhill, Forkhill, County Armagh, Northern Ireland
 St. Oliver Plunkett's Primary School, Kilmore, Kilmore, County Armagh, Northern Ireland